Darija Jurak and Andreja Klepač defeated Nadiia Kichenok and Raluca Olaru in the final, 6–3, 6–1, to win the doubles tennis title at the 2021 Bad Homburg Open. It marked Jurak's eighth career WTA Tour doubles title, her second of the season, and Klepač's ninth.

This was the inaugural edition of the tournament.

Seeds

Draw

Draw

References

External Links 
 Main Draw
 WTA website

Bad Homburg Opennbsp;- Doubles